Rickard Näslin (born 24 September 1947) is a Swedish musician living in Jämtland, Sweden. He is a violinist and composer of Swedish folk music. Rickard is riksspelman (Masterplayer of Swedish Folk Music).

In 2000, Riffage.com wrote about Rickard's music:

"You never thought that you would enjoy Swedish folk music. You might not have know that it existed. Rickard Näslin from Östersund, Sweden, writes and performs the most exciting music you'll hear. It just so happens it is Swedish Folk! It's playful and romantic, full of life, depth, and passion."

References
Jones, Petra: Jämtland (Sweden) Forest, Fjörds, and Fiddles, in Fiddler Magazine (Fall 2006)

External links

Jamtlandica.com Folk Music from Jämtland, Sweden with tunes in MP3 to download

Listen to Rickard Näslin's compositions
Jeanettes brudvals This tune in note form
Schottis från Rödon This tune in note form
Görels vals
Farbror Olles Ganglat

Rickard Näslin (violin) and Göran Andersson (violin) play Lapp-Nils songs from Western Jämtland:
Lapp-Nils polska, after Johan Olofsson Munter Mattmar
Lapp-Nils polska, after Bengt Bixo Mörsil

Fiddlers from Sweden
Living people
Male violinists
Nordic folk musicians
Riksspelmän
Swedish composers
Swedish male composers
Swedish fiddlers
Swedish folk musicians
1947 births
21st-century violinists
21st-century Swedish male musicians